Puglia was a protected cruiser of the Italian Regia Marina (Royal Navy). She was the last of six  ships, all of which were named for regions of Italy. She was built in Taranto between October 1893 and May 1901, when she was commissioned into the fleet.

Puglia served abroad for much of her early career, including periods in South American and East Asian waters. She saw action in the Italo-Turkish War in 1911–1912, primarily in the Red Sea. During the war she bombarded Ottoman ports in Arabia and assisted in enforcing a blockade on maritime traffic in the area. She was still in service during World War I; the only action in which she participated was the evacuation of units from the Serbian Army from Durazzo in February 1916. During the evacuation, she bombarded the pursuing Austro-Hungarian Army. After the war, Puglia was involved in the occupation of the Dalmatian coast, and in 1920 her captain was murdered in a violent confrontation in Split with Croatian nationalists. The old cruiser was sold for scrapping in 1923, but much of her bow was preserved at the Vittoriale degli italiani museum.

Design

The ships had a ram bow and a flush deck. Each vessel was fitted with a pair of pole masts. She had a crew of between 213 and 278.

Her propulsion system consisted of a pair of vertical triple-expansion steam engines that drove two screw propellers. Steam was supplied by four cylindrical fire-tube boilers that were vented into two funnels.

Puglia was armed with a main battery of four  L/40 guns mounted singly, with two side by side forward and two side by side aft. A secondary battery of six  L/40 guns were placed between them, with three on each broadside. Close-range defense against torpedo boats consisted of eight  guns, eight  guns, and a pair of machine guns. She was also equipped with two  torpedo tubes.

Service history
Puglia was built by the new Regia Marina shipyard in Taranto, the first major warship to be built there. Her keel was laid down in October 1893, and she was launched on 22 September 1898. Fitting-out work proved to be a lengthy process, and she was not ready for service until 26 May 1901. This new type of ship rapidly replaced protected cruisers like Puglia.

Puglia was immediately deployed to East Asian waters following her commissioning. In July, she was in Australia during the visit of the British Prince George, son of then-King Edward VII. The ship was still on the China station as of 1904. Puglia was present in Rio de Janeiro in January 1908 when the Great White Fleet arrived in the port. She greeted the American fleet with a 15-gun salute. The German cruiser  was also moored in the harbor at the time, as was the Brazilian fleet.

Italo-Turkish War
At the outbreak of Italo-Turkish War in September 1911, Puglia was stationed in eastern Africa, where Italy had colonies in Eritrea and Somaliland. Puglia and the cruiser , which had recently arrived from Asian waters, bombarded the Turkish port of Aqaba on 19 November to disperse a contingent of Ottoman soldiers there. Hostilities were temporarily ceased while the British King George V passed through the Red Sea following his coronation ceremony in India—the ceasefire lasted until 26 November. On 16 December, she intercepted the steamer  leaving the Suez Canal, bound for Kunfuda with a load of coal for the Ottoman gunboats stationed there.

In early 1912, the Italian Red Sea fleet searched for a group of seven Ottoman gunboats thought to be planning an attack on Eritrea, though they were in fact immobilized due to a lack of coal. Puglia and Calabria carried out diversionary bombardments against Jebl Tahr, and Al Luḩayyah, while Piemonte and the destroyers  and  searched for the gunboats. On 7 January, they found the gunboats and quickly sank four in the Battle of Kunfuda Bay; the other three were forced to beach to avoid sinking as well. Puglia and the rest of the Italian ships returned to bombarding the Turkish ports in the Red Sea before declaring a blockade of the city of Al Hudaydah on 26 January. The cruiser fleet in the Red Sea then began a campaign of coastal bombardments of Ottoman ports in the area. A blockade was proclaimed of the Ottoman ports, which included  Al Luḩayyah and Al Hudaydah. The Ottomans eventually agreed to surrender in October, ending the war.

World War I

Italy declared neutrality at the start of World War I, but by July 1915, the Triple Entente had convinced the Italians to enter the war against the Central Powers. Admiral Paolo Thaon di Revel, the Italian naval chief of staff, believed that Austro-Hungarian submarines could operate too effectively in the narrow waters of the Adriatic, which could also be easily seeded with minefields. The threat from these underwater weapons was too serious for him to use the fleet in an active way. Instead, Revel decided to implement blockade at the relatively safer southern end of the Adriatic with the main fleet, while smaller vessels, such as the MAS boats, conducted raids on Austro-Hungarian ships and installations.

The closest Puglia came to engaging a hostile vessel came on 27 January 1915, when while patrolling off Durazzo, she encountered the Austro-Hungarian scout cruiser , but the Austro-Hungarian ship retreated without either vessel firing a shot. In late February 1916, Puglia and the cruiser  covered the withdrawal of elements of the Serbian Army from Durazzo. The Austro-Hungarian Army was pursuing the retreating Serbians, and Puglia provided gunfire support to delay the Austro-Hungarian advance. She was converted into a minelayer later that year. She entered service in this role on 1 July, and she remained on active duty through the early 1920s.

After the war, Puglia had been assigned to patrol the Dalmatian coast. On 11 July 1920, men from the ship became involved in the unrest in Split. During a violent confrontation with a group of Croats, the ship's captain and a sailor were shot and killed. Puglia was sold for scrapping on 22 March 1923. While the ship was being dismantled, the Italian dictator Benito Mussolini donated the ship's bow section to the writer and ardent nationalist Gabriele D'Annunzio, who had it installed at his estate as part of the Vittoriale degli italiani museum.

Notes

References

External links
 Puglia Marina Militare website 

Regioni-class cruisers
Ships built in Taranto
1898 ships
Museum ships in Italy